Kazimierz Januszewski (date of birth and death unknown) was a Polish footballer who played as a forward. He played for Lechia Gdańsk during their early years, making a total of 12 appearances and scoring 12 goals in all competitions for the club.

References

Lechia Gdańsk players
Polish footballers
Association football forwards